Dappula tertia is a moth of the Psychidae family. It is widely distributed in the Indo-Australian region, where it is found from India to the Solomon Islands. The habitat consists of lowland areas.

The larvae have been recorded feeding on Annona muricata and Cocos nucifera. It can cause damage in Oil Palm and Coffee plantations.

References

Moths described in 1847
Psychidae